This list of volcanoes in Iceland includes active and dormant volcanic mountains, of which 18 have erupted since human settlement of Iceland began around 900 AD.


List

Volcanic zones and systems 

Iceland has four major volcanic zones surrounding an hypothetical hotspot:
 the Reykjanes zone (RVZ), subdivided into the Reykjanes Ridge (RR) (the Mid-Atlantic Ridge South of Iceland) and the Reykjanes Volcanic Belt (RVB) (on the main island);
 the West Volcanic Zone (WVZ);
 the East Volcanic Zone (EVZ) (extended to the Westman Islands, South of the main island);
 the North Volcanic Zone (NVZ).

The Mid-Iceland Belt (MIB) connects them across central Iceland.

In Iceland's East Volcanic Zone (EVZ), the central volcanoes, Vonarskarð and Hágöngur belong to the same volcanic system; this also applies to Bárðarbunga and Hamarinn, and to Grímsvötn and Þórðarhyrna.

North of Iceland, the Mid-Atlantic Ridge is called Kolbeinsey Ridge (KR) and is connected to the North Volcanic Zone via the Tjörnes Fracture Zone (TFZ). Also the South Iceland Seismic Zone (SISZ) is another fracture zone, which connects the East and West Volcanic Zones. Both fracture zones also include their own volcanic systems, smaller than those in the Mid-Iceland Belt.

Besides the hotspot area fragmenting the Mid-Atlantic Ridge, there are also two intraplate volcanic belts: Öræfajökull (ÖVB) on the Eurasian plate, and Snæfellsnes (SVB) on the North American plate. It is proposed that the east-west line going from the Grímsvötn volcano in the Mid-Iceland Belt (MIB) to the Snæfellsnes volcanic belt (SVB) shows the movement of the North American Plate over the Iceland hotspot.

See also 
 Lists of volcanoes
 Volcanism of Iceland
 Geology of Iceland
 List of volcanic eruptions in Iceland

References 

 Thor Thordarsson, Armann Hoskuldsson: Classic Geology in Europe 3. Iceland. Harpenden, Terra, 2002
 https://www.pbs.org/wgbh/nova/earth/doomsday-volcanoes.html

Iceland
 
Volcanoes
Volcanoes